Micropentila ogojae, the Ogoja dots, is a butterfly in the family Lycaenidae. It is found in eastern Nigeria and the Republic of the Congo. The habitat consists of primary forests.

References

Butterflies described in 1965
Poritiinae